Mane Skerry is a small island in the central part of Lystad Bay, off Horseshoe Island, Antarctica. It was named from association with nearby Mite Skerry; an initial misspelling of the phrase "might and main" became established at the Falkland Islands Dependencies Survey station in the years 1955–57.

References

Islands of Graham Land
Fallières Coast